Tectamus  (Ancient Greek: Τέκταμος "craftsman", derived from tectainomai "to build", "plan", from tecton, "carpenter", "builder")  was a king of Crete and hero of ancient Hellenic mythology. He was also called Tectaphus, Teutamus, Tectauus and Tectaeus.

Name 
Joseph Vendryes had suggested that the name Teutamus, after the legendary Pelasgian founder, may contain the Proto-Indo-European root  ('tribe, people'). Later scholars proposed a relation of Pelasgian Teutamus with similar names that appear in Italy in later times.

Mythology 
Tectamus was the son of Dorus and grandson of Hellen. According to Diodorus Siculus, Tectamus invaded Crete together with a horde of Aeolian and Pelasgian settlers and became the island's king. It was the third of the tribes that migrated to Crete. According to another version, Tectamus was a chief of Dorians and Achaeans. He married Cres' or Cretheus' daughter who gave birth to his son Asterion.

In later Greek historiography 
Historian Ctesias wrote of a king of "Assyrian" provenance named Teutamus, and this historical personage appears in an epic tale involving Memnon, son of Eos.

Notes

References 

 Diodorus Siculus, The Library of History translated by Charles Henry Oldfather. Twelve volumes. Loeb Classical Library. Cambridge, Massachusetts: Harvard University Press; London: William Heinemann, Ltd. 1989. Vol. 3. Books 4.59–8. Online version at Bill Thayer's Web Site
Graves, Robert, The Greek Myths: The Complete and Definitive Edition. Penguin Books Limited. 2017. 
Princes in Greek mythology

Kings of Crete
Kings in Greek mythology
Cretan characters in Greek mythology
Cretan mythology